Studies in the Psychology of Sex is a book by Havelock Ellis:

 Studies in the Psychology of Sex Vol. 1
 Studies in the Psychology of Sex Vol. 2
 Studies in the Psychology of Sex Vol. 7